Kuy, also known as Kui, Suay  or Kuay, is a Katuic language, part of the larger  Austroasiatic family spoken by the Kuy people of Southeast Asia.

Kuy is one of the Katuic languages within the Austroasiatic family. It is spoken in Isan, Thailand by about 300,000 people, in Salavan, Savannakhet and Sekong Provinces of Laos by about 64,000; and in Preah Vihear, Stung Treng and Kampong Thom Provinces of northern Cambodia by 15,500 people.

Names
Spelling variants and varieties include the following (Sidwell 2005:11).
Kui
Kuy
Kuay
Koay
Souei. The term "Souei" is also applied to other groups, such as a Pearic community in Cambodia.
Yeu
Nanhang
Kouy. A textbook in French is published for this variant (Parlons Kouy).

Dialects
Van der haak & Woykos (1987-1988) identified two major Kui varieties in Surin and Sisaket provinces of eastern Thailand, Kuuy and Kuay. Van der haak & Woykos also identified the following divergent Kui varieties in Sisaket Province, Thailand.
Kui Nhə: Sisaket District (10 villages), Phraibung District (5 villages), Rasisalai District (4 villages). About 8,000 people.
Kui Nthaw (Kui M'ai): Rasisalai District (5 villages), Uthumphornphisai District (9 villages). All villages mixed with Lao/Isaan.
Kui Preu Yai: Prue Yai Subdistrict, Khukhan District. 

Mann & Markowski (2005) reported the following four Kuy dialects spoken in north-central Cambodia.
Ntua
Ntra: includes the subdialects of Auk and Wa
Mla: 567 speakers in the single village of Krala Peas, Choam Ksan District, Preah Vihear Province
"Thmei"

A variety of Kui/Kuy called Nyeu (ɲə) is spoken in the villages of Ban Phon Kho, Ban Khamin, Ban Nonkat, Ban Phon Palat, and Ban Prasat Nyeu in Sisaket Province, Thailand. The Nyeu of Ban Phon Kho claim that their ancestors had migrated from Muang Khong, Amphoe Rasisalai, Sisaket Province.

In Buriram Province, Kuy is spoken in the 4 districts of Nong Ki, Prakhon Chai, Lam Plai Mat, and Nong Hong (Sa-ing Sangmeen 1992:14). Within Nong Ki District, Kuy villages are located in the southern part of Yoei Prasat (เย้ยปราสาท) Subdistrict and in the western part of Mueang Phai (เมืองไผ่) Subdistrict (Sa-ing Sangmeen 1992:16).

Phonology 
The following is the phonology of the Kui (Surin) language:

Consonants

Vowels 

Vowel sounds may also be distinguished using breathy voice:

Locations
The following list of Kuy village locations in Sisaket Province is from Van der haak & Woykos (1987-1988:129). Asterisks (placed before village names) denote ethnically mixed villages, in which ethnic Kuy reside with ethnic Lao or Khmer.

Kui Nhə
Mueang District เมือง
Tambon Phonkho โพนค้อ: Phonkho โพนค้อ, Nong, Yanang, Klang, Non
Tambon Thum ทุ่ม: Khamin
Phayu District พยุห์
Tambon Phayu พยุห์: *Nongthum
Tambon Phromsawat พรหมสวัสดิ์: Samrong, Khothaw
Tambon Nongphek โนนเพ็ก: *Khokphek โคกเพ็ก
Phraibung District ไพรบึง
Tambon Prasatyae ปราสาทเยอ: Prasatyaenua ปราสาทเยอเหนือ, Prasatyaetai ปราสาทเยอใต้, Khawaw, Phonpalat, Cangun
Rasisalai District ราษีไศล
Tambon Mueangkhong เมืองคง: Yai ใหญ่
Sila Lat District ศิลาลาด
Tambon Kung กุง: Kung กุง, Muangkaw เมืองเก่า, *Chok

Kui Nthaw/M'ai
All Kui Nthaw/M'ai live in mixed villages.

Rasisalai District ราษีไศล
Tambon Nong Ing หนองอึ่ง: *Tongton, *Huai Yai ห้วยใหญ่, *Dnmuang, *Kokeow, *Hang
Uthumphornphisai District อุทุมพรพิสัย
Tambon Khaem แขม: *Phanong, *Sangthong, *Sawai, *Nongphae, *Phae
Pho Si Suwan District โพธิ์ศรีสุวรรณ
Tambon Naengma หนองม้า: *Nongma หนองม้า, *Songhong, *Songleng, *Nongphae

Kuay Prue Yai
Khukhan District ขุขันธ์
Tambon Prueyai ปรือใหญ่: Preu Yai, Makham, Pruekhan, and village no.12

See also
Ethnic groups in Cambodia
List of ethnic groups in Laos
Ethnic groups in Thailand

Notes

References
Mann, N., & Markowski, L. (2004). A rapid appraisal survey of Kuy dialects spoken in Cambodia. Chiang Mai: Dept. of Linguistics, Graduate School, Payap University.
Mann, N., & Markowski, L. (2005). A rapid appraisal survey of Kuy dialects spoken in Cambodia. SIL International.
Sidwell, Paul. (2005). The Katuic languages: classification, reconstruction and comparative lexicon. LINCOM studies in Asian linguistics, 58. Muenchen: Lincom Europa. 

Languages of Cambodia
Languages of Laos
Languages of Thailand
Katuic languages
Ethnic groups in Cambodia
Ethnic groups in Laos
Ethnic groups in Thailand